Martin Bueno (born 19 July 1991) is a Uruguayan footballer who plays as a forward for Uruguayan Primera División club Cerro Largo, on loan from Bellinzona.

Club career
In 2018 he was a member of New Zealand's Central Premier League-winning Napier City Rovers team,  winning the league's Golden Boot trophy as that year's top goalscorer. He was also a member of Napier's 2019 Chatham Cup winning team. Bueno won the golden boot of the 2020 Oceania Champions League, scoring six goals in three games representing Auckland-based side Eastern Suburbs.

On 4 February 2021 he moved to Italy and signed with Livorno.

References

1991 births
Living people
Uruguayan footballers
Association football forwards
Atenas de San Carlos players
Alacranes de Durango footballers
Napier City Rovers FC players
Hamilton Wanderers players
Eastern Suburbs AFC players
AC Bellinzona players
U.S. Livorno 1915 players
Uruguayan Segunda División players
New Zealand Football Championship players
Swiss Promotion League players
Uruguayan expatriate footballers
Expatriate footballers in Mexico
Expatriate soccer players in the United States
Expatriate association footballers in New Zealand
Expatriate footballers in Italy